Shutthefrontdoor is a racehorse that won the Irish Grand National in 2014.	
Ridden by Barry Geraghty and starting at odds of 8/1, he finished 3/4 lengths clear of Golden Wonder.	
Shutthefrontdoor finished fifth in the 2015 Grand National and ninth in the 2016 Grand National.

References

External links
Racing Post Profile

National Hunt racehorses
2007 racehorse births
Racehorses trained in the United Kingdom